Ezzouhour (Arabic:الزهور)  is a town and commune in the Sousse Governorate, Tunisia. As of 2014 it had a population of 17,348. Ezzouhour was originally a spontaneous locality that formed as migrants from the countryside of other areas of Sousse and the neighbouring governorate of Kairouan settled there. It was then connected to public services and integrated in the urban area of Sousse.

See also
List of cities in Tunisia

References

Populated places in Tunisia
Communes of Tunisia
Sousse Governorate